Rachel Glennerster  (born 21 October 1965) is an Associate Professor of Economics at the University of Chicago. Glennerster served as chief economist for the Foreign, Commonwealth & Development Office, formerly the Department for International Development (DFID), the UK's ministry for international development cooperation, after formerly serving on DFID's Independent Advisory Committee on Development Impact. She is on leave as an affiliated researcher of the Abdul Latif Jameel Poverty Action Lab (J-PAL). She was the executive director of J-PAL until 2017 and the lead academic for Sierra Leone at the International Growth Centre, a research centre based jointly at The London School of Economics and Political Science and the University of Oxford. She helped establish the Deworm the World Initiative, a program that targets increased access to education and improved health from the elimination of intestinal worms for at-risk children  and has helped "deworm" millions of children worldwide.

Before joining J-PAL and the International Growth Centre, Glennerster worked as an economic adviser to HM Treasury, a Development Associate at the Harvard Institute for International Development, and as a senior economist at the International Monetary Fund (IMF). She was also a member of the UK delegation to the IMF and World Bank in the mid-1990s. Glennerster is a member of Giving What We Can, an effective altruism organization whose members pledge to give 10% of their income to effective charities.

Glennerster is the coauthor of Running Randomized Evaluations, a book on running randomized impact evaluations in practice in developing countries, and Strong Medicine: Creating Incentives for Pharmaceutical Research on Neglected Diseases, a book that strategizes incentives for developers to undertake the costly research needed to develop vaccines.

Glennerster is cited as among the top 2% of female economists as of November 2021, according to IDEAS/RePEC.

She was appointed Companion of the Order of St Michael and St George (CMG) in the 2021 New Year Honours for services to international development.

Education 
Glennerster received her BA in PPE from Oxford University in 1988, where she was a member of Somerville College. She then proceeded to obtain a Masters in Economics from Birkbeck College, University of London in 1995 and a doctorate in economics from the same institution in 2004. 
Glennerster also taught at Harvard University's Kennedy School of Government as an adjunct lecturer from 2000 to 2004.

Research 
Glennerster's areas of research includes and focuses on randomized trials of health, education, microcredit, women’s empowerment, and governance. Geographically, her research has spanned West Africa and South Asia, including countries such as Burkina Faso, Sierra Leone, Bangladesh, India, and Pakistan.

Findings of her research include:

 Community-driven development programs, a popular strategy for foreign aid donors, have a positive short-run effect on local public goods provision and economic outcomes, but little effect on sustained improvements in collective action and inclusion of marginalized groups. This evidence is based on randomized allocation of community-driven development programs across regions in Sierra Leone (with Katherine Casey and Edward Miguel). 
 A randomized evaluation on the impact of microfinance in India showed that microcredit group-based lending had little impact on consumption, health, education, women's empowerment, average business profits, starting a new business, and on average monthly expenditure per capita. Yet positive effects were found on durable goods expenditure and business investments (with Abhijit Banerjee, Esther Duflo, and Cynthia Kinnan).
 In a research of behavioral economics of complying with tuberculosis medication in Pakistan, researches measured the impact of daily SMS medication reminders of treatment outcomes to patients of tuberculosis. No impact was found between the SMS messages and patients' self-reported adherence to treatment regimes, physical health, and psychological health (with Aamir Khan and Shama Mohammed).

References

British development economists
Alumni of Somerville College, Oxford
Alumni of Birkbeck, University of London
1965 births
Living people
Harvard Institute for International Development
20th-century 	British economists
21st-century 	British economists
British women economists
Companions of the Order of St Michael and St George